Blusang Itim (International title: Beauty Within / ) is a 2011 Philippine television drama series broadcast by GMA Network. The series is based on a Philippine comic book by Elena Patron of the same title. Directed by Jay Altajeros, it stars Kylie Padilla. It premiered on May 16, 2011 on the network's Dramarama Sa Hapon line up replacing Alakdana. The series concluded on August 12, 2011 with a total of 65 episodes. It was replaced by Pahiram ng Isang Ina in its timeslot.

Overview
Blusang Itim was as a novel written by Elena Patron. It was serialized from 1981 to 1983. In 1986, it was adapted into a film by Seiko Films featuring Snooky Serna in the lead role.

Sarah Lahbati, Gwen Zamora and Isabelle Daza were considered for the lead role for the television adaptation. Kylie Padilla later got the role.

Cast and characters

Lead cast
 Kylie Padilla as Jessa Escote-Soriano / Jessa Lopez-Santiago / Jessica Madrid

Supporting cast
 Carl Guevarra as Melchor Reyes
 Lucho Ayala as Edward Escote
 Frank Magalona as Angelo Soriano
 Wynwyn Marquez as Cleo Salcedo
 Andrea Torres as Alison Escote
 Marissa Delgado as Concha Lopez-Santiago
 Maritoni Fernandez as Victoria Soriano
 Rita Avila as Rhea Escote
 Jackie Lou Blanco as Esmeralda Lopez-Santiago
 Gary Estrada as Gerald Escote
 Maureen Mauricio as Elsa Reyes
 Chariz Solomon as Chiqui
 Rochelle Barrameda as Camille Santos
 Shirley Fuentes as Beth Sta. Maria
 Rene Salud

Guest cast
 Sabrina Man as young Jessa
 Arkin Magalona as young Angelo
 JM Reyes as young Melchor
 Snooky Serna as Loleng

Ratings
According to AGB Nielsen Philippines' Mega Manila household television ratings, the pilot episode of Blusang Itim earned a 15.6% rating. While the final episode scored an 18.5% rating.

Accolades

References

External links
 

2011 Philippine television series debuts
2011 Philippine television series endings
Fantaserye and telefantasya
Filipino-language television shows
GMA Network drama series
Television shows based on comics
Television shows set in the Philippines